Virginia De Agostini is an international figure skating judge for the International Skating Union, with her career beginning in 2006. She is married to American actor Daniel McVicar, whom she met during the 2007 production of Notti sul Ghiaccio for RAI Television in Rome, Italy.

She resides in Torino, Italy.

References

Figure skating judges
Living people
Year of birth missing (living people)
Place of birth missing (living people)